The 1908–09 Welsh Amateur Cup was the nineteenth season of the Welsh Amateur Cup. The cup was won by Carnarvon United who defeated Oak Alyn Rovers 5-1 in the final at Colwyn Bay.

Preliminary round

First round

Second round

Third round

Fourth round

Semi-final

Final

References

1908-09
Welsh Cup
1908–09 domestic association football cups